Ꞩ, ꞩ, ẜ (S with oblique stroke) is an extended Latin letter that was used in Latvian orthography until 1921; ꞩ was also used in Lower Sorbian until 1950. A variant of the letter S with a stroke is also used in Luiseño and Cupeño.

Uses in alphabets 
In Latvian orthography until 1921 it meant the sound  (while the S s meant the sound ). Spelling reform Ꞩ ẜ ꞩ, Ꞩch ẜch, Tẜch tẜch were replaced by S s, Š š, Č č respectively.
  
In the final version of the Unified Northern Alphabet, created in the USSR in the 1930s for the languages of the peoples of Siberia and the Far North, for the Selkup, Khanty and Mansi languages, it meant the sound .

Code positions 
The forms are represented in Unicode as:
 
 

The long s form with the bar (diacritic) is encoded at:

See also 
 Unified Northern Alphabet

References

Latin-script letters
Latvian language